Eggerth is a surname. Notable people with the surname include:

Agnė Eggerth (born 1978), Lithuanian sprinter
Karl Eggerth (1861–1888), Austrian lichenologist
Marta Eggerth (1912–2013), Hungarian actress and singer
Sabine Eggerth (1943–2017), German actress

See also
Eggert